"Young Right Now" is a song by German DJ and record producer Robin Schulz and Israeli singer-songwriter and producer Dennis Lloyd, released as a single on 12 November 2021. The song was written by Daniel Deimann, Dennis Bierbrodt, Lloyd, Guido Kramer, Jürgen Dohr, Schulz, Robin Stjernberg, Sandro Cavazza, Fredrik Samsson, Stefan Dabruck, and produced by Schulz, Lloyd and Junkx.

Background and content
 Ale Mancinelli of EDM-Lab wrote that the song talks about "the young people who are fighting against global warming". It is written in the key of F major, with a tempo of 123 beats per minute.

Track listing

Credits and personnel
Credits adapted from AllMusic.

 Dennis Bierbrodt – composer, lyricist
 Sandro Cavazza – composer, lyricist
 Stefan Dabruck – composer, lyricist
 Daniel Deimann – composer, lyricist
 Jürgen Dohr – composer, lyricist
 Junkx – engineer, keyboards, mixing, producer, programming
 Guido Kramer – composer, lyricist
 Dennis Lloyd – composer, guitar, lyricist, primary artist, producer, vocals
 Robin Schulz – composer, keyboards, lyricist, primary artist, producer, programming
 Michael Schwabe – mastering
 Robin Stjernberg – composer, lyricist

Charts

Weekly charts

Year-end charts

Certifications

References

2021 singles
2021 songs
Robin Schulz songs
Dennis Lloyd songs
Songs written by Dennis Lloyd
Songs written by Robin Schulz
Songs written by Sandro Cavazza
Songs written by Jürgen Dohr